Brigadier General Mohammad Daoud Al-Abbasi known as Al-Za’eem Mohammad Daoud (الزعيم محمد داود; 11 July 1914 – 19 January 1972), was appointed the 19th Prime Minister and Minister of Foreign Affairs of the military government in Jordan during the events of Black September in Jordan in 1970.

Early life

Mohammad Daoud was born in Silwan, Jerusalem, Palestine (region). He worked as a police officer in Tulkarm which was a part of Jordan until after 1948.

In 1952, he became a member of the Jordanian delegation of the Jordanian/Israeli Mixed Armistice Commission. He held the position of Presidency of the joint Jordanian delegation in 1958 until the war of 1967. In 1956 he was wounded by a mine. He was rescued by Israeli officer, Aharon Camara, because the Jordanians officers were scared to enter the mine field. In 1967 war he was taken to jail by the Israeli army for 17 days then was released to Amman, Jordan. He continued working as a head of the Jordanian/Israeli Mixed Armistice Commission until 1970. In 1969 he got permission to enter Israel for the funeral of his wife.

Black September

On September 16, 1970, King Hussein of Jordan declared martial law and appointed Brigadier Mohammad Daoud as Prime Minister to lead the first military government in Jordan. Despite efforts to defuse the tension between the Jordanian army and the Palestinian movements, between 16 and 25 September 1970, the escalating conflict resulted in the death of thousands and this conflict became known as Black September.

An Arab League Summit Committee assigned Kuwaiti Minister of Defense Saad Al-Sabah, Sudanese head of state Gaafar Nimeiry, and the Deputy Foreign Minister of Saudi Arabia, Omar Al-Saqqaf to investigate and report back the cause of the clash to the Arab summit. Meanwhile, the Arab League held a meeting for all the head of Arab states in Cairo.

King Hussein assigned Mohammad Daoud to join the summit. After 10 days only as a prime minister, on 24 September, out of frustration and pressure after being unable to avoid this developing conflict and the devastating results, Mohammad Daoud submitted his resignation from his position to the Jordanian Ambassador in Cairo, Hazem Nuseibah.

Mohammad Daoud requested political asylum in Cairo, following his resignation. President Gamal Abdel Nasser of Egypt asked Mohammad Daoud to stay in Cairo for consultation of Jordanian affairs.

The timing of this resignation amidst all the turbulent and rapidly developing events at that time came as a surprise to many, and there is no doubt that it had a dramatic impact in ending the military conflict in Jordan at a faster pace.

Illness and death

Mohammad Daoud was hospitalized in Cairo towards the end of 1971 being diagnosed with a brain tumor, and was sent later to Paris to undergo brain surgery. Then he asked to be treated in Hadassah hospital in Jerusalem, and he was granted permission, but he could not make it. On 10 January 1972, he returned to the Military Hospital in Amman, Jordan and died 9 days later, on Wednesday 19 January.

His body was transferred from Amman to Jerusalem through Allenby Bridge after a formal funeral ceremony. A prayer was conducted at al-Aqsa mosque on Friday, 21 January 1972. He was buried at his home town Silwan as he had wished, the town where he was born and originally grew up.

References

Prime Ministers of Jordan
Foreign ministers of Jordan
Jordanian people of Palestinian descent
Politicians from Jerusalem
1914 births
1972 deaths